M. Manikandan is an Indian director, writer and cinematographer who works in Tamil cinema. He began his career as an assistant cinematographer in Tamil films. He made his directorial debut with the short film Wind (2010) and got his breakthrough in feature films with Kaaka Muttai, which won the National Film Award for Best Children's Film in 2015.

Biography
Manikandan was born into a family of police officers in Usilampatti, Madurai district, Tamil Nadu. He did his schooling in different towns owing to his father's frequent transfers. After completing his schooling, he did his diploma in automobile engineering. He developed an interest in photography and started his career as a wedding photographer. He also did odd jobs such as designing ID cards for school and college children. In a later interview he claimed that he did all these in order to save money to pursue a course in digital photography at the Mindscreen Film Institute, a film school managed by Rajiv Menon.

In the mid 2000s, he started his film career as an assistant cinematographer in Tamil films. During this time, he co-wrote several scripts for short films. He got his major break with the short film Wind (2010), his directorial debut. The film brought him critical acclaim and was screened in several film festivals. The film caught the attention of Tamil film director Vetrimaran, who helped him produce Kaaka Muttai, his feature film debut. The film revolves around two slum-dwelling kids whose solitary desire in life is to taste a pizza. The film premiered at the 2014 Toronto International Film Festival and was released theatrically in June 2015. At the 62nd National Film Awards, it won two honours – Best Children's Film and Best Child Artist. The film won the Audience Award for Best Feature at the 13th Indian Film Festival of Los Angeles.

In 2021, Manikandan signed Ilaiyaraaja for the songs and background score for his film Kadaisi Vivasayi, but later he replaced Ilaiyaraaja with Santhosh Narayanan as he wasn't satisfied with the background score of the veteran composer, prompting Ilaiyaraaja to lodge a complaint against the director at Music composer’s association.

Filmography

Short films
Wind (2010)

References

External links
 

Living people
Film directors from Tamil Nadu
Indian male screenwriters
Tamil film directors
Tamil screenwriters
Tamil film cinematographers
Cinematographers from Tamil Nadu
People from Madurai district
Screenwriters from Tamil Nadu
21st-century Indian dramatists and playwrights
21st-century Indian photographers
21st-century Indian male writers
Directors who won the Best Children's Film National Film Award
Year of birth missing (living people)
21st-century Indian screenwriters